The 2016–17 Highland Football League  started in July 2016 and ended on 22 April 2017.

For promotion to Scottish League Two, the league champions playoff with the Lowland Football League champions (or other eligible team from outside the SPFL to be nominated by the Scottish FA), with the winner then playing the team finishing 10th and bottom in Scottish League Two in a promotion and relegation playoff to determine the entrants for the 2017–18 League Two season.

League table

Results

Promotion play-offs

Buckie Thistle qualified for the Play-offs after a 9–0 win against Strathspey Thistle on 22 April 2017 secured them the Highland Football League title for the 11th time.

As Highland League champions, Buckie Thistle played East Kilbride, champions of the 2016–17 Lowland League, over two legs. Buckie Thistle drew the first leg at home 2–2 and lost 2–1 away, losing 3–4 on aggregate. Therefore, Buckie Thistle will remain in the Highland League for the 2017–18 season.

References

Highland Football League seasons
Highland
Scottish